Iranian Sign Language (ISL) is the sign language used by Deaf and hard-of-hearing people in Iran. It is a true sign language, unlike the Baghcheban phonetic hand alphabet, which is a form of cued speech.

Deaf community in Iran 
The estimate of the population of the deaf community in Iran varies between 1.5 and 3 million; Siyavoshi (2017) published that the Iranian Department of Health and Welfare reported 200,000 people self-identifying as deaf when registering for social and medical services. However, no estimate is available for the number of ISL users in the country.

Names 
In 2021, the deaf linguist Dr. Ardavan Guity proposed the term Esharani as a new name for the sign language used in Iran, also referred to as Farsi Sign Language, Persian Sign Language, and Zaban Eshareh Irani (ZEI).

In 1980, the dictionary "Culture: Farsi Sign Language For Deaf, 1st Volume" was published by the Iranian National Organization for the Welfare of the Deaf, referring to the sign language used by deaf and hard-of-hearing communities in Iran. However Farsi (Persian) is not exclusive to Iran, whereas Iranian Signed Language, based on Guity's work, is exclusive to Iran. Additionally, Persian is not the only language spoken in Iran. In 1984, a university group based in Tehran published the first of four editions of "Dictionary of Farsi Sign Language: Standardized Signs", although the English cover used the title "Persian Sign Language Collection for the Deaf", and used the terms Farsi Language and Persian Sign Language interchangeably. It was not until 1999 that the phrase Iranian Sign Language was used in a Master's thesis. However, the thesis was written by a hearing author without involvement from the deaf community in Iran.

In 2014, Guity, Abbas Behmanesh, and Jodie Novak created a video describing the linguistic properties of Zaban Eshareh Irani, the transliteration of the Persian phrase meaning Iranian Sign Language. Following the video's release, the term Zaban Eshareh Irani gained traction in social media use, particularly among deaf communities in ethnic groups, such as Gilaks, Kurds, and Baloch people whose primary language is not Farsi and felt alienated from terms such as Farsi Sign Language. However ZEI was also problematic, as Persian does not have capitalization or acronyms. Consequently, Guity and Dr. Sara Siyavoshi, a hearing linguist from Iran, proposed the name Esharani, derived from the Persian morpheme eshar (sign), ran (Iran), and the suffix -i, commonly used for language names in Persian. The sign for Esharani itself is derived from the combination of the signs for "Iran" and "sign", where the non-dominant hand is in the five handshape and the dominant hand moves in a spiral motion with the thumb out over the palm of the non-dominant hand. However the acceptability of the name is still under discussion among the deaf communities in Iran.

See also
Qahveh Khaneh Sign Language

References

Scholarly literature

External links
 About.com: Deaf Community - Iran
 Linguistic Research and Zaban Eshareh Irani - video by Behmanesh, Guity, and Novak in Esharani
 

Sign languages
Languages of Iran
Sign languages of Iran